The North Fork John Day Wilderness is a wilderness area within the Umatilla and Wallowa–Whitman National Forests in the Blue Mountains of northeastern Oregon.

The wilderness consists of four separate units: the main  unit of the North Fork John Day drainage; the Greenhorn Unit to the south; the Tower Mountain Unit to the north; and the Baldy Creek Unit to the east.  Approximately  of the Vinegar Hill-Indian Rock Scenic Area also lie within the wilderness.

The North Fork John Day Wilderness is located within the larger Elkhorn Fire Management Area, and the area's fire plan allows for the use of Prescribed Natural Fire under certain circumstances.

Topography

It encompasses two entire subranges of the Blue Mountains—the Greenhorn Mountains and the ragged Elkhorn Mountains. A continuous vegetative canopy covers most of the land, including dense virgin stands of conifer species like Douglas-fir, white fir, western larch and lodgepole pine. The headwaters of several waterways are located in the wilderness, including Bull Creek, Baldy Creek, and Crawfish Creek, as well as the North Fork John Day River,  of which are designated Wild and Scenic.

Geology
The granite and sedimentary rock that makes up much of the North Fork John Day Wilderness reflect the Blue Mountains' history as a volcanic island archipelago in the Pacific Ocean some 250 million years ago.  As the crust of the earth shifted, the archipelago collided with the advancing North American Plate approximately 200 million years ago.  Later, bubbles of less dense granitic rock, or batholiths, rose through the sediment to form the granite cores of the Elkhorn and Greenhorn ranges.  Columbia River basalt flows buried the region some 15 million years ago, the remains of which can be seen today in the rimrock on the benchlands in the western portion of the wilderness.

History
The North Fork John Day drainage bustled with gold and silver mining operations in the mid-19th century, and traces of the thousands of miners who labored here are still visible. Old mining structures, building foundations, and dredged ditches and trash dumps left behind by the miners are all visible.  Many of these features are being left in place to naturally disappear over time, consistent with the Wilderness Act's purpose to have no permanent human works in wilderness areas.  The Sumpter Valley Gold Dredge once excavated the riverbeds in the area, and is now restored as a state heritage site in Sumpter.

Wildlife
The North Fork John Day Wilderness is known for its big game and anadromous fish habitat. Dominant wildlife species include Rocky Mountain elk and mule deer. There is currently an elk herd estimated to number beyond 50,000 and a herd of mule deer that reportedly exceeds 150,000. Other wildlife in the North Fork John Day Wilderness include mountain goats and black bears.

Recreation
Primary recreational activities in the North Fork John Day Wilderness are hiking, camping, horseback riding, hunting, fishing, cross-country skiing, rafting, kayaking, wildlife watching, and rock climbing the granite cliffs of the Elkhorn Mountains.

See also
 List of Oregon Wildernesses
 List of U.S. Wilderness Areas

References

External links
 Wallowa–Whitman National Forest - North Fork John Day Wilderness - U.S. Forest Service
 Umatilla National Forest - North Fork John Day Wilderness - U.S. Forest Service
 North Fork John Day Wild and Scenic River Management Plan (PDF) - U.S. Forest Service
 John Day River (North Fork), Oregon - National Wild and Scenic Rivers System

Protected areas of Grant County, Oregon
IUCN Category Ib
Protected areas of Umatilla County, Oregon
Wilderness areas of Oregon
Umatilla National Forest
Wallowa–Whitman National Forest
1984 establishments in Oregon
Protected areas established in 1984